Stone House was the first bungalow constructed in Ooty (India).  It was built by John Sullivan and was called Kal Bangala by the tribals (Kal means stone in Tamil).  Today, it is the official residence of the Principal of the Government Arts College, Ooty. The tree in front of the bungalow is known as the Sullivan's oak.

History 
John Sullivan started building Stonehouse in 1822. He acquired land from the Toda people at  an acre.

See also
 Ooty Lake
 Mariamman temple, Ooty
 Ooty Golf Course
 St. Stephen's Church, Ooty

Further reading

References 

Houses completed in the 19th century
Buildings and structures in Tamil Nadu
Bungalow architecture
Houses in India
Buildings and structures in Ooty